Malek Jaziri was the defending champion and successfully defended his title.

Jaziri won the title after defeating Matteo Berrettini 7–6(7–4), 0–6, 7–5 in the final.

Seeds

Draw

Finals

Top half

Bottom half

References
Main Draw
Qualifying Draw

Amex-Istanbul Challenger - Singles
2017 Singles